The bodybuilding events  at the 2005 World Games in Duisburg was played between 16 and 17 July. 48 athletes, from 25 nations, participated in the tournament. The bodybuilding competition took place in TAM Theatre.

Participating nations

Medal table

Events

Men

Women

References

External links
 International Federation of Bodybuilding and Fitness
 Bodybuilding on IWGA website
 Results

 
2005 World Games
2005
Bodybuilding competitions in Germany
2005 in bodybuilding